The Starry Plough is the official newsletter (Initally a newspaper, then a magazine) of the Irish Republican Socialist Party. In 2006 it proclaimed on its website that "The Starry Plough is the only paper that stands firmly against British rule and for the destruction of capitalism in Ireland." The paper also focuses on socialist solidarity issues around the world.

History
The name of the paper is taken from the flag of the same name. The decision to use the name the Starry Plough was inspired by a newspaper produced by Official Sinn Féin in Derry City in the early 1970s. Produced by the local branch of Official Sinn Féin in Derry, it was edited by Jackie Ward (who went on to edit The United Irishman) and Joe Sweeney (who sided with the IRSP following the split with the Officials). The suggestion for the IRSP newspaper was made by Derry members to the IRSP Ard Comhairle in early 1975. The Irish translation An Camchéachta was provided by Mairin Bean Ui Chionnaith, an Irish-language scholar and republican.

The first edition of the new (IRSP) The Starry Plough was published in April 1975 under the editorship of Mick Ahern. It included details of the first IRSP public meeting (Dublin, 12 February), an editorial on the IRSP, an interview with Seamus Costello, Easter Rising commemoration notices and a statement from the National Executive of the IRSP.

Subsequent editors included Osgur Breatnach, James Daly, Mary Reid, Seamus Ruddy and (again) Mick Ahern. Important contributors have included Bernadette McAliskey, Tom Hayes, Ite Ni Chionnaith, Eamonn McCann, Niall Leonach, Redmond O'Hanlon, Gerry Lawless, Siobhan Molloy, and London SWP cartoonist Phil Evans.

References

External links

Irish Republican Socialist Party
Irish republican newspapers
Political magazines published in Ireland
Political newspapers published in Ireland
Socialist newspapers
Works about The Troubles (Northern Ireland)